Andrea Longo (born 26 June 1975 in Piove di Sacco) is a former Italian middle-distance runner.

Biography
He achieved his personal best just before Sydney Olympics, running 1'43"74 in Rieti in September 2000, reaching the second place in the all-time ranking in Italy, behind former world record holder Marcello Fiasconaro. He was disqualified from the 800 metres final at the 2000 Summer Olympics after barging Switzerland's André Bucher. He served a two-year ban from 2001 for testing positive for nandrolone.

After his ban his best performances have been a 5th place at the 2003 World Championships and a 7th place at the 2006 European Athletics Championships, both in the 800m. He was also a semi-finalist at the 2004 Olympics. He is the European record holder for the rarely run 600m (1'14"41). He is the husband of Fabé Dia.

Achievements

National titles
Andrea Longo has won 7 times the individual national championship.
4 wins in the 800 metres (1998, 1999, 2000, 2005)
1 win in the 800 metres indoor (1997)
2 wins in the 1500 metres indoor (2004, 2005)

See also
 Italian all-time lists - 800 metres
 List of sportspeople sanctioned for doping offences

References

External links
 
BBC report on drugs ban

1975 births
Living people
Italian male middle-distance runners
Athletes (track and field) at the 2000 Summer Olympics
Athletes (track and field) at the 2004 Summer Olympics
Olympic athletes of Italy
Doping cases in athletics
Athletics competitors of Fiamme Oro
Mediterranean Games silver medalists for Italy
Athletes (track and field) at the 1997 Mediterranean Games
World Athletics Championships athletes for Italy
Mediterranean Games medalists in athletics